Frederick Arthur Cobb (11 February 1901 – 27 March 1950) was a radio engineer and Labour Party politician in the United Kingdom.

He was the son of a farmer and joined the merchant navy as a radio operator while still a youth, during the First World War. He later became a maintenance engineer in the 2LO station which later became the BBC. In 1926 he became chief engineer of the Indian Broadcasting Company in Calcutta, where he remained for three years before becoming the general manager of a firm in High Wycombe producing radio and television equipment.

In the landslide election of 1945 he won the Elland constituency  from the Conservatives. When this seat was abolished for the 1950 general election he transferred to the new constituency of Brighouse and Spenborough which covered much of the same area. He died just over a month later, aged 49, making the government's slender majority even more precarious until the party held the seat a by-election in May 1950.

References
 Obituaries, The Times, 28/29 March 1950.

External links 
 

1901 births
1950 deaths
Labour Party (UK) MPs for English constituencies
UK MPs 1945–1950
UK MPs 1950–1951
British radio personalities
British sailors
British Merchant Service personnel of World War I